Blessing Oborududu (born 12 March 1989, in Gbanranu) is a Nigerian freestyle wrestler. She is currently ranked as the world number two woman wrestler and also the first wrestler to win an Olympic medal representing Nigeria at the Olympics. She is also a ten time African champion from 2010 to 2020.

Career 
Oborududu was invited to a national camp in 2007 to take part at the African Games after noticing her impressive performances at school inter-house wrestling competitions. Her parents were initially against her ambition to become a sport wrestler and advised her that wrestling is allocated only for boys. She idolised Canadian-Nigerian wrestler Daniel Igali who was originally regarded as the first person from Nigeria to win an Olympic medal in wrestling.

She has won a gold medal at the African Wrestling Championships every year for the last 11 years, except for 2012 when she did not enter due to competing in the 2012 Summer Olympics. She competed in the freestyle 63 kg event at the 2012 Summer Olympics and was eliminated in the 1/8 finals by Monika Michalik.

She won the bronze medal in the women's middleweight at the 2014 Commonwealth Games after defeating Chloe Spiteri in her bronze medal match. She also competed in the women's middleweight at the 2016 Summer Olympics, losing to Soronzonboldyn Battsetseg in the second round. She won a gold medal for women 63 kg category at the 2017 Islamic Solidarity Games. She won a gold medal at the Gold Coast 2018 Commonwealth Games in the 68 kg women's freestyle wrestling event, defeating Canada's Danielle Lappage.

She qualified at the 2021 African & Oceania Wrestling Olympic Qualification Tournament to represent Nigeria at the 2020 Summer Olympics in Tokyo, Japan. In June 2021, she won the silver medal in her event at the 2021 Poland Open held in Warsaw, Poland.

On 3 August 2021, she won the silver medal in the women's freestyle 68 kg after losing to America's Tamyra Mensah-Stock 4–1 at the 2020 Summer Olympics. She also became the first Nigerian to win an Olympic medal in wrestling. She also eventually won the Nigeria's first silver medal at the Tokyo Olympics.

In 2022, she won the gold medal in the 68 kg event at the Yasar Dogu Tournament held in Istanbul, Turkey. by beating her counterpart Meerim Zhumanazarova from Kyrgyzstan 3–2. She won the gold medal in her event at the 2022 African Wrestling Championships held in El Jadida, Morocco. A month later, she won one of the bronze medals in her event at the Matteo Pellicone Ranking Series 2022 held in Rome, Italy. She won the gold medal in the women's 68 kg event at the 2022 Commonwealth Games held in Birmingham, England.

References

External links
 

1989 births
Living people
Nigerian female sport wrestlers
Olympic wrestlers of Nigeria
Wrestlers at the 2012 Summer Olympics
Wrestlers at the 2016 Summer Olympics
Wrestlers at the 2010 Commonwealth Games
Wrestlers at the 2014 Commonwealth Games
Wrestlers at the 2018 Commonwealth Games
Wrestlers at the 2022 Commonwealth Games
Commonwealth Games medallists in wrestling
Commonwealth Games gold medallists for Nigeria
Commonwealth Games silver medallists for Nigeria
Commonwealth Games bronze medallists for Nigeria
African Games gold medalists for Nigeria
African Games medalists in wrestling
Competitors at the 2015 African Games
Competitors at the 2019 African Games
African Wrestling Championships medalists
Islamic Solidarity Games medalists in wrestling
Wrestlers at the 2020 Summer Olympics
Olympic silver medalists for Nigeria
Olympic medalists in wrestling
Medalists at the 2020 Summer Olympics
21st-century Nigerian women
Medallists at the 2010 Commonwealth Games
Medallists at the 2014 Commonwealth Games
Medallists at the 2018 Commonwealth Games
Medallists at the 2022 Commonwealth Games